The Institute of Optics and Electronics of the Chinese Academy of Sciences is a Chinese science research institute located in the town of Wenxing, Shuangliu District of Chengdu, in southwest China's Sichuan province. It is the largest institute of Chinese Academy of Sciences (CAS) in southwest China, founded in 1970. It is a diversified organization with operations in photoelectric tracking measurement, beam control, adaptive optics, astronomical target photoelectric observation and recognition, advanced optical manufacturing, aerospace photoelectric equipment, micro nano optics, microelectronics optics, and biomedical optics. It has more than 1,200 staff, including 2 academicians of the Chinese Academy of Engineering (CAE), 1 winner of National Science Fund for Outstanding Young Scholars, 1 recruitment program of global experts, 1 chief scientist of National 973 Program, 8 state-level experts in the field of opto-electronics, 13 academic and technological research leaders in Sichuan, and 350 senior S&T personnel.

History
The Institute of Optics and Electronics, Chinese Academy of Sciences was founded in 1970.

Laboratories
Nine Chinese state key laboratories are now under the Institute of Optics and Electronics, such as State Key Laboratory of Optical Technologies for Micro fabrication, CAS Key labs on Beam Control, Adaptive Optics, and Chengdu Measurement and Testing laboratory for Geometrical Parameter and CAS Photoelectric Precision Mechanics.

Leaders

Directors

Communist Party Secretaries

References

External links

 

Physics organizations
Optics institutions
Scientific organizations established in 1970
Organizations based in Chengdu
1970 establishments in China
Research institutes of the Chinese Academy of Sciences
Education in Chengdu